Nationality words link to articles with information on the nation's poetry or literature (for instance, Irish or France).

Events
 October 7 — Celebrations marking the 50th anniversary of the first reading of Allen Ginsberg's poem "Howl" were staged in San Francisco, New York City, and in Leeds in the UK. The British event, Howl for Now, was accompanied by a book of essays of the same name, edited by Simon Warner, reflecting on the piece's enduring power and influence.
 Maurice Riordan, Irish poet living in London, named poetry editor of Poetry London

Works published in English
Listed by nation where the work was first published (and again by the poet's native land, if different); substantially revised works listed separately:

Australia

 David Brooks, Walking to Point Clear. Blackheath: Brandl & Schlesinger
 Pam Brown, Ken Bolton, and Laurie Duggan, Let's Get Lost, Sydney: Vagabond
 Laurie Duggan, Compared to What: Selected Poems 1971–2003, Exeter: Shearsman
 Alan Gould, The Past Completes Me: Selected Poems 1973–2003
 John Kinsella, The New Arcadia, winner of the 2006 Arts Queensland Judith Wright Calanthe Award; W.W. Norton; Australian living in and published in the United States
 Jennifer Maiden, Friendly Fire Giramondo, 
 Chris Mansell, Mortifications & Lies (Kardoorair, Armidale) 
 Les Murray:
 Hell and After, Four early English-language poets of Australia, Carcanet
 Editor, Best Australian Poems 2004, Melbourne, Black Inc.
 Philip Salom, The Well Mouth, Fremantle Arts Centre, 
 Jaya Savige, Latecomers
 Chris Wallace-Crabbe, The Universe Looks Down, Brandl & Schlesinger,

Canada
 Shannon Bramer, The Refrigerator Memory (Coach House Books) 
 Stephen Cain, American Standard/Canada Dry (Coach House Books) 
Margaret Christakos:
Sooner (Coach House Books) 
Retreat Diary (Toronto: Book Thug)
 Brian Joseph Davis, Portable Altamont (Coach House Books) 
 George Elliott Clarke, Illuminated Verses. Toronto: Canadian Scholars' Press, 
 Anne Compton, Processional
 Sylvia Legris, Nerve Squall, winner of 2006 Pat Lowther Award, winner of the 2006 Canadian Griffin Poetry Prize, shortlisted for Saskatchewan Book Award (Coach House Books) 
 Michael Palmer, Company of Moths, shortlisted for the Griffin Poetry Prize (2006)
 John Pass, Stumbling in the Bloom, Governor General's Award 2006.
 James Reaney, Souwesto Home. Stan Dragland, ed. (Brick Books)
 Sherwin Tija, The World is a Heartbreaker (Coach House Books),

India, in English
 Meena Alexander, editor, Indian Love Poems (poetry in English), Everyman's Library/Knopf, anthology, by an Indian writing living in and published in the United States
 Dilip Chitre, Post Climactic Love Poem (poetry in English), a single, long poem; London and New Delhi: Aark Arts;
 Jayanta Mahapatra, Random Descent( Poetry in English ), Third Eye Communications,
 Jerry Pinto and Arundhathi Subramaniam, Confronting Love, contemporary Indian love poetry in English; Penguin India, 
 K. Siva Reddy, Mohana! Oh Mohana! and Other Poems, translated from the original Telugu by M. Sridhar and Alladi Uma, New Delhi: Sahitya Akademi, .
 Melanie Silgardo and Eunice de Souza, editors, The Puffin Book of Poetry for Children, New Delhi: Puffin Books, 
 Eunice de Souza, editor, Early Indian Poetry in English: An Anthology: 1829–1947, New Delhi: Oxford University Press, .
 Arundhathi Subramaniam, Where I Live, Mumbai: Allied, ; Indian, English-language
 Arundhathi Subramaniam, co-editor, Confronting Love, Delhi: Penguin India, ; an anthology of contemporary love poetry

Ireland
 Sara Berkeley, Strawberry Thief, Oldcastle: The Gallery Press, 
 Ciaran Carson (translator), The Midnight Court (Cúirt An Mhéan Oíche), an 18th-century poem by Brian Merriman, Oldcastle: The Gallery Press, 
 Eiléan Ní Chuilleanáin:
Verbale by Michele Ranchetti, translated by Eiléan Ní Chuilleanáin and others, Dublin: Instituto Italiano di Cultura
 After the Raising of Lazarus: Poems Translated from the Romanian by Eiléan Ní Chuilleanáin, poems by Ileana Mălăncioiu, Cork: Southword Editions
 Seán Dunne, Collected, Oldcastle: The Gallery Press, 
 Thomas McCarthy, Merchant Prince, Anvil Press, London, Irish work published in the United Kingdom
 Immanuel Mifsud, translated by Maurice Riordan, Confidential Reports, Maltese poet published in Ireland, Southword Editions
 Justin Quinn, American Errancy: Empire, Sublimity and Modern Poetry, University College of Dublin Press (scholarship)
 Gabriel Rosenstock, I Met A Man ... Doghouse Books,

New Zealand
 Raewyn Alexander:
 It's a Secret: Selected Poems (Auckland: Brightsparkbooks)
 Writing Poetry: Fireworks, Clay & Architecture (Auckland: Brightsparkbooks)
 Stu Bagby, As it was in the beginning (Steele Roberts Publications Ltd)
 Wystan Curnow, Modern Colours (Jack Books)
 Stephanie de Montalk, Cover Stories (Victoria University Press)
 Anne Kennedy, Time of the Giants (Auckland University Press)
 Michele Leggott, Milk & Honey, Auckland: Auckland University Press
 Bill Manhire, Lifted, New Zealand
 Cilla McQueen, Fire-penny, Otago University Press
 Karlo Mila, Dream Fish Floating (Huia Publishers)
 James Norcliffe, Along Blueskin Road (Canterbury University Press)
 Gregory O'Brien, Afternoon of An Evening Train (Victoria University Press)
 Vivienne Plumb, Scarab: A Poetic Documentary (Seraph Press)
 Anna Smaill, The Violinist in Spring (Victoria University Press)
 Robert Sullivan, Voice Carried My Family (Auckland University Press)
 Ian Wedde, Three Regrets and a Hymn to Beauty (Auckland University Press)
 Kate Camp, Beauty Sleep, (Victoria University Press)

Poets in Best New Zealand Poems
Poems from these 25 poets, selected by Emma Neale were included in Best New Zealand Poems 2004, published online this year:

 Tusiata Avia
 Hinemoana Baker
 Diane Brown
 James Brown
 Geoff Cochrane

 Linda Connell
 Wystan Curnow
 Anne French
 Paula Green
 David Howard

 Andrew Johnston
 Tim Jones
 Anne Kennedy
 Tze Ming Mok
 Peter Olds

 Vincent O'Sullivan
 Vivienne Plumb
 Richard Reeve
 Elizabeth Smither
 Kendrick Smithyman

 C. K. Stead
 Brian Turner
 Sue Wootton
 Sonja Yelich
 Ashleigh Young

United Kingdom
 Maurice Bowra (died 1971), New Bats in Old Belfries
 Carol Ann Duffy:
 Another Night Before Christmas (illustrated by Marc Boutavant), John Murray (children's poetry).
 Rapture, Picador
 John Heath-Stubbs, Pigs Might Fly
 Jackie Kay, Life Mask
 Tim Kendall, Strange Land
 Nick Laird,  To a Fault, Northern Ireland-born poet
 José Letria, The Moon Has Written You a Poem, children's poetry translated and adapted by Irish expatriate poet Maurice Riordan from the original Portuguese and published in the UK, WingedChariot Press, Tunbridge Wells, Kent
 Derek Mahon, Harbour Lights. Gallery Press
 Thomas McCarthy, Merchant Prince, London; Anvil Press, Irish work published in the United Kingdom
 Brian Merriman: The Midnight Court (translation by Ciarán Carson of  Cúirt an Mhéan Oíche), Gallery Press; Wake Forest University Press, 2006, posthumous
 Pete Morgan, August Light 
 Alice Oswald, Woods etc., Faber and Faber,

Anthologies in the United Kingdom
 Alice Oswald, The Thunder Mutters: 101 Poems for the Planet (editor), Faber and Faber, 
 Nii Ayikwei Parkes and Kadija Sesay, Dance the Guns to Silence: 100 Poems for Ken Saro-Wiwa (flipped eye), anthology with a foreword by Saro-Wiwa's son, Ken Wiwa, including poems by Mutabaruka, Sharan Strange, Chris Abani, Jayne Cortez, Kwame Dawes, Amiri Baraka, Kamau Braithwaite; and poems in Catalan, Scots, Creole, Castilian paying tribute to Khana, Saro-Wiwa's mother tongue.

Criticism, scholarship and biography in the United Kingdom
 Elaine Feinstein, Anna of all the Russias: A life of Anna Akhmatova, London: Weidenfeld & Nicolson, 2005; N.Y.: Alfred A. Knopf, 2006

United States
 Elizabeth Alexander, American Sublime
 Meena Alexander, editor, Indian Love Poems, Everyman's Library/Knopf, anthology, by an Indian writing living in and published in the United States
 John Ashbery, Where Shall I Wander
 Bei Dao, Midnight's Gate translation by Matthew Fryslie, edited by Christopher Mattison (New Directions), 
 Ted Berrigan, Collected Poems (University of California Press), edited by his widow Alice Notley and sons Anselm and Edmund Berrigan, posthumous
 Frank Bidart, Star Dust, one of The New York Times "100 Notable Books of the Year"
 Oscar Brown Jr., What It Is: Poems and Opinions of Oscar Brown Jr. (Oyster Knife Publishing)
 Charles Bukowski, The Flash of Lightning Behind the Mountain: New Poems (Ecco)
 Ana Castillo, Watercolor Women/Opaque Men in Verse (Curbstone Press)
 Adrian Castro, Wise Fish: Tales in 6/8 Time (Coffee House Press)
 Dan Chiasson, Natural History: Poems, one of The New York Times "100 Notable books of the year"
 Henri Cole, Vingt-Deux Poèmes(Yvon Lambert, Paris)
 Billy Collins, The Trouble With Poetry and Other Poems
 Mark Doty, School of the Arts, HarperCollins
 Forrest Gander, Eye Against Eye (New Directions)
 Jorie Graham, Overlord: Poems, one of The New York Times "100 Notable books of the year"
 Suheir Hammad, ZaatarDiva
 Allison Hedge Coke, Off-Season City Pipe Coffee House Press
 Michael Hofmann, translator, Ashes for Breakfast: Selected Poems by Durs Grünbein, German, Macmillan/Farrar, Straus and Giroux
 John Hollander, editor, Poems Bewitched and Haunted
 Paul Hoover, Poems in Spanish (Omnidawn Publishing)
 June Jordan, Directed by Desire: The Collected Poems of June Jordan (Copper Canyon Press), posthumous
 Ted Kooser, Delights and Shadows (Copper Canyon Press)
 Stanley Kunitz, The Collected Poems (W. W. Norton)
 Laurie Lamon, The Fork Without Hunger, CavanKerry Press
 James McMichael, Capacity, a book-length poem and finalist for the 2006 National Book Award for Poetry
 W. S. Merwin:
 Migration: New and Selected Poems, awarded the National Book Award for Poetry this year; Port Townsend, Washington: Copper Canyon Press
 Present Company, Port Townsend, Washington: Copper Canyon Press
 Translator: Sir Gawain and the Green Knight, a New Verse Translation, New York: Knopf
 W. K. Lawrence, State of Love and Trust
 David Lehman, editor, Great American Prose Poems: From Poe to the Present (Scribner), an anthology
 William Logan, The Whispering Gallery
 Richard Loranger, Poems for Teeth (We Press)
 Claire Lux and John Most, Atelier (AQP Collective)
 W. S. Merwin, Migration: New and Selected Poems, one of The New York Times "100 Notable books of the year"
 Ange Mlinko, Starred Wire (Coffee House Press, 2005), winner of the 2004 National Poetry Series
 Rusty Morrison, Whethering, University Press of Colorado, January, 
 Sharon Olds, Strike Sparks: Selected Poems, 1980–2002 (Knopf)
Hans Ostrom The Coast Starlight: Collected Poems 1976-2006. Dog Ear Publishing. 
 Jason Shinder, editor, The Poem That Changed America: "Howl" Fifty Years Later, essays on the impact of Allen Ginsberg's "Howl" on American literature and culture; Farrar, Straus and Giroux
 Patti Smith, Auguries of Innocence
 Tony Tost, World Jelly
 Brian Turner, Here, Bullet (Alice James Books), war poetry
Richard Wilbur, Collected Poems, 1943–2004 (Harvest Books), one of The New York Times "100 Notable books of the year"
 Marvin X, Land of My Daughters: Poems 1995–2005 (Black Bird Press)
Jesse Lee Kercheval, Chartreuse (Hollyridge Press)

Poets whose works appeared in The Best American Poetry 2005
The 75 poets included in The Best American Poetry 2005, edited by David Lehman, co-edited this year by Paul Muldoon:

A. R. Ammons
John Ashbery
Maureen Bloomfield
Catherine Bowman
Stephanie Brown
Charles Bukowski
Elena Karina Byrne
Victoria Chang
Shanna Compton
James Cummins
Jamey Dunham
Stephen Dunn
Karl Elder
Lynn Emanuel
Elaine Equi

Clayton Eshleman
Andrew Feld
Beth Ann Fennelly
Edward Field
Richard Garcia
Amy Gerstler
Leonard Gontarek
Jessica Goodheart
George Green
Arielle Greenberg
Marilyn Hacker
Matthea Harvey
Stacey Harwood
Terrance Hayes
Samuel Hazo

Anthony Hecht
Jennifer Michael Hecht
Lyn Hejinian
Ruth Herschberger
Jane Hirshfield
Tony Hoagland
Vicki Hudspith
Donald Justice
Mary Karr
Garret Keizer
Brigit Pegeen Kelly
Galway Kinnell
Rachel Loden
Sarah Manguso
Heather McHugh

D. Nurske
Steve Orlen
Eugene Ostashevsky
Linda Pastan
Adrienne Rich
James Richardson
Mary Ruefle
Kay Ryan
Jerome Sala
Mary Jo Salter
Christine Scanlon
Jason Schneiderman
Julie Sheehan
Charles Simic
Louis Simpson

W. D. Snodgrass
Gary Snyder
Maura Stanton
Dorothea Tanning
James Tate
Chase Twichell
David Wagoner
Rosanna Warren
Marlys West
Susan Wheeler
Richard Wilbur
Cecilia Woloch
Charles Wright
Mattew Yeager
Kevin Young

Criticism, scholarship and biography in the United States
 Anthony Holden, The Wit in the Dungeon: The Remarkable Life of Leigh Hunt — Poet, Revolutionary, and the Last of the Romantics

Works published in other languages

Brazil
 Ricardo Domeneck, Carta aos anfíbios, Rio de Janeiro: Bem-Te-Vi
 Miguel Sanches Neto, Venho de um país obscuro e outros poemas
 Marco Vasques, Sístole, Rio de Janeiro: Bem-Te-Vi

Chile
 Sergio Badilla Castillo, Transrealistic Poems and Some Gospels. 2005. Aura Latina. Santiago/Stockholm.

India
Listed in alphabetical order by first name:
 Anamika, Khurduri Hatheliyan, Delhi: Radhakrishna Prakashan; Hindi-language
 Basudev Sunani, Karadi Haata, Nuapada: Eeshan-Ankit Prakashani; Oraya-language
 Debashis Chanda, editor, Visual Rhapsody, an anthology including poems by Mithu Sen, New Delhi: Niyogi Offset; Bengali-language
 K. Satchidanandan, Ghazalukal, Geetangal ("Ghazals and Geets"); Malayalam-language
 K. Siva Reddy, Atanu-Charitra, Hyderabad: Jhari Poetry Circle; Telugu-language
 Mallika Sengupta, Shreshtha Kabita, Dey's Publishers; Bengali-language
 Namdeo Dhasal, Mee Marale Sooryachya Rathache Ghode Saat, Marathi-language
 S. Joseph, Identity Card, Kottayam: DC Books, ; Malayalam-language
 Tarannum Riyaz, Purani Kitabon ki Khushboo, New Delhi: Modern Publishing House; Urdu-language
 Udaya Narayana Singh, Madhyampurush Ekvachan, New Delhi: Vani Prakashan; Maithili-language

Bangladesh
 Rahman Henry, Tomake Basona Kori, A Book of Poetry in Bengali, BALAKA, Chittagong, Bangladesh.
 Rahman Henry, Khunjhara Nodi ("The River that Bleeds"), A Book of Poetry in Bengali, BALAKA, Chittagong, Bangladesh.

Poland
 Tomasz Różycki, translator, Rzut kośćmi nigdy nie zniesie przypadku, translated from the original French of Stéphane Mallarmé, Kraków: Korporacja Ha!Art
 Eugeniusz Tkaczyszyn-Dycki, Dzieje rodzin polskich
 Adam Zagajewski, Anteny, Kraków: a5
 Wisława Szymborska, Dwukropek ("Colon")

Other languages
 Nicole Brossard, editor, Anthologie: De la poésie des femmes au Québec des origines à nos jours, Rémue-Ménage, France
 Dmitry Bykov, Boris Pasternak, published by Molodaya Gvardiya, received the "National Bestseller Prize", biography, Russia
 Abdellatif Laabi, Écris la vie, La Différence, coll. Clepsydre, Paris, Prix Alain Bosquet 2006, Moroccan author writing in French and published in France
 Pavel Nastin, Yazyk Zhestov ("Sign Language"); Russia
 Rami Saari, Ha-shogun Ha-xamishi ("The Fifth Shogun"), Israel

Awards and honors

International
 Nobel prize: Harold Pinter
 Golden Wreath of Poetry: William S. Merwin (United States)

Australia
 C. J. Dennis Prize for Poetry: M. T. C. Cronin, 
 Kenneth Slessor Prize for Poetry: Samuel Wagan Watson, Smoke Encrypted Whispers

Canada
 Archibald Lampman Award: Stephen Brockwell, Fruitfly Geographic
 Atlantic Poetry Prize: David Helwig, The Year One
 Gerald Lampert Award: Ray Hsu, Anthropy
 Governor General's Literary Awards: Anne Compton, Processional (English); Jean-Marc Desgent, Vingtièmes siècles (French)
 Griffin Poetry Prize: Canadian: Roo Borson, Short Journey Upriver Toward Oishida
 Griffin Poetry Prize: International, in the English Language: Charles Simic, Selected Poems: 1963–2003
 Pat Lowther Award: Roo Borson, Short Journey Upriver Toward Oishida
 Prix Alain-Grandbois: Robert Melançon, Le Paradis des apparences
 Dorothy Livesay Poetry Prize: Jan Zwicky, Robinson's Crossing
 Prix Émile-Nelligan: Renée Gagnon, Des fois que je tombe

New Zealand
 Prime Minister's Awards for Literary Achievement:
 Montana New Zealand Book Awards First-book award for poetry
 Poetry: Sonja Yelich, Clung, Auckland University Press
 NZSA Jessie Mackay Best First Book Award for Poetry: Sonja Yelich, Clung. Auckland University Press

United Kingdom
 Cholmondeley Award: Jane Duran, Christopher Logue, M. R. Peacocke, Neil Rollinson
 Eric Gregory Award: Melanie Challenger, Carolyn Jess, Luke Kennard, Jaim Smith
 Forward Poetry Prize:
Best Collection: David Harsent, Legion (Faber & Faber)
Best First Collection: Helen Farish, Intimates (Jonathan Cape)
 T. S. Eliot Prize (United Kingdom and Ireland): Carol Ann Duffy, Rapture
 Whitbread Award for poetry (United Kingdom): Christopher Logue, Cold Calls
 Shortlisted: David Harsent, Legion, Richard Price, Lucky Day, Jane Yeh, Marabou

United States
 Aiken Taylor Award for Modern American Poetry – B. H. Fairchild
 Agnes Lynch Starrett Poetry Prize awarded to Rick Hilles for Brother Salvage: Poems
 AML Award for poetry to Lance Larsen for In All Their Animal Brilliance
 Arthur Rense Prize awarded to Daniel Hoffman by the American Academy of Arts and Letters
 Bollingen Prize for Poetry, Jay Wright
 Brittingham Prize in Poetry, Susanna Childress Winner, Jagged with Love
 California Poet Laureate: Al Young, appointed
 Crab Orchard Series in Poetry Open Competition Awards: David Hernandez, Always Danger
 Discovery/The Nation Award: Eduardo C. Corral
 Frost Medal: Marie Ponsot
 National Book Award for Poetry: W. S. Merwin: Migration: New and Selected Poems
 North Carolina Poet Laureate: Kathryn Stripling Byer appointed.
 Pulitzer Prize for Poetry: Ted Kooser, Delights & Shadows
 Robert Fitzgerald Prosody Award: Marina Tarlinskaya
 Ruth Lilly Poetry Prize: C. K. Williams
 Wallace Stevens Award: Gerald Stern
 Whiting Awards: Thomas Sayers Ellis, Ilya Kaminsky, John Keene, Dana Levin, Spencer Reece, Tracy K. Smith
 Fellowship of the Academy of American Poets: Claudia Rankine

Deaths

Birth years link to the corresponding "[year] in poetry" article:

See also

Poetry
List of poetry awards

External links
"A Timeline of English Poetry", Representative Poetry Online, University of Toronto

References

2000s in poetry

Poetry